Judge Dyer may refer to:

Charles E. Dyer (1834–1905), judge of the United States District Court for the Eastern District of Wisconsin
David Patterson Dyer (1838–1924), judge of the United States District Court for the Eastern District of Missouri
David W. Dyer (1910–1998), judge of the United States Courts of Appeals for the Fifth and Eleventh Circuits
John James Dyer (1809–1855), judge of the United States District Court for the District of Iowa

See also
Justice Dyer (disambiguation)